Lucien Bonaparte, 1st Prince of Canino and Musignano (born Luciano Buonaparte; 21 May 1775 – 29 June 1840), was a French politician and diplomat of the French Revolution and the Consulate. He served as Minister of the Interior from 1799 to 1800 and as the president of the Council of Five Hundred in late 1799.

The third surviving son of Carlo Bonaparte and his wife Letizia Ramolino, Lucien was the younger brother of Napoleon Bonaparte. As president of the Council of Five Hundred, he was one of the participants of the Coup of 18 Brumaire that brought Napoleon to power in France.

Early life
Lucien was born in Ajaccio, Corsica on 21 May 1775. He was educated in mainland France, initially studying at the military schools of Autun and Brienne but later, after his father's death, at the seminary of Aix-en-Provence, from which he dropped out in 1789. In 1769, the Corsican Republic had been conquered and annexed by France. Lucien's father Carlo Bonaparte had been a strong supporter of Corsican patriots under Pasquale Paoli, but later switched to become a supporter of French rule.

Revolutionary activities
Lucien became a staunch supporter of the French Revolution upon its outbreak in 1789, when he was 14 years old. He returned to Corsica at the start of the Revolution, and became an outspoken orator at the Corsican chapter of the Jacobin Club in Ajaccio, where he adopted the alias "Brutus Bonaparte". In 1791, he became a secretary of Pascal Paoli, but broke with him in May 1793, along with his brother Napoleon.

After returning to mainland France, Lucien held a number of minor administrative posts from 1793 until 1795, when he was briefly jailed for his Jacobin activity, during the Thermidorian Reaction. He was released after an intervention by Napoleon, who then found him an administrative assignment in the Army of the North.

Political career

President of the Council of Five Hundred
In 1798, Lucien was elected member of the Council of Five Hundred for Corsica's Liamone department. Later, as president of the Council, which he moved to the suburban security of Saint-Cloud – Lucien Bonaparte was crucial with a combination of bravado and disinformation to the coup d'état of 18 Brumaire (date based on the French Republican Calendar) in which Napoleon Bonaparte overthrew the government of the Directory to replace it by the Consulate on 9 November 1799. Lucien mounted a horse and galvanized the grenadiers by pointing a sword at his brother and swearing to run him through if he ever betrayed the principles of Liberté, égalité, fraternité. The following day Lucien arranged for Napoleon's formal election as First Consul.

Diplomacy
Napoleon made him Minister of the Interior under the consulate, which enabled Lucien to falsify the results of the plebiscite for First Consul but brought him into competition with Joseph Fouché, the chief of police, who showed Napoleon a subversive pamphlet possibly written by Lucien and effected a breach between the brothers. Some evidence exists that Napoleon himself wrote the pamphlet and scapegoated his brother when it was received poorly. 

Lucien was sent as ambassador to the court of Charles IV of Spain, (November, 1800), where his diplomatic talents won over the Bourbon royal family and, perhaps as importantly, the minister Manuel de Godoy.

Disputes with Napoleon
Though he was a member of the Tribunat in 1802 and was made a senator of the First French Empire, Lucien came to oppose many of Napoleon's ideas. In 1804, with Lucien disliking Napoleon's intention to declare himself as Emperor of the French and to marry Lucien off to a Bourbon Spanish princess, the Queen of Etruria, Lucien spurned all imperial honours and went into self-imposed exile by living initially in Rome, where he bought the Villa Rufinella in Frascati.

Later years

In 1809, Napoleon increased pressure on Lucien to divorce his wife and return to France, even having their mother write a letter encouraging him to abandon her and return. With the whole of the Papal States annexed to France and the Pope imprisoned, Lucien was a virtual prisoner in his Italian estates, requiring permission of the Military Governor to venture off his property. He attempted to sail to the United States to escape his situation but was captured by the British. When he disembarked in Britain, he was greeted with cheers and applause by the crowd, many of whom saw him as anti-Napoleonic.

The government permitted Lucien to settle comfortably with his family at Ludlow, and later at Thorngrove House in Grimley, Worcestershire, where he worked on a heroic poem on Charlemagne. Napoleon, believing Lucien had deliberately gone to Britain and thus a traitor, had Lucien omitted from the Imperial almanacs of the Bonapartes from 1811 until his 1814 abdication.

Lucien returned to France following his brother's abdication in April 1814. Lucien continued to Rome, where on 18 August 1814 he was made Prince of Canino, Count of Apollino, and Lord of Nemori by Pope Pius VII and Prince of Musignano on 21 March 1824 by Pope Leo XII.

In the Hundred Days after Napoleon's return to France from exile in Elba, Lucien rallied to his brother's cause, and they joined forces once again during Napoleon's brief return to power. His brother made him a French Prince and included his children into the Imperial Family, but this was not recognized by the Bourbons after Napoleon's second abdication. Subsequently, Lucien was proscribed at the Restoration and deprived of his fauteuil at the Académie Française. In 1836 he wrote his Mémoires. He died in Viterbo, Italy, on 29 June 1840, of stomach cancer, the same disease that claimed his father, his sister Pauline and his brother Napoleon.

Academic activities
Lucien Bonaparte was the inspiration behind the Napoleonic reconstitution of the dispersed Académie Française in 1803, where he took a seat. He collected paintings in la maison de campagne at Brienne, was a member of Jeanne Françoise Julie Adélaïde Récamier's salon and wrote a novel, La Tribu indienne. He was an amateur archeologist, establishing excavations at his property in Frascati which produced a complete statue of Tiberius, and at Musignano which rendered a bust of Juno. Bonaparte owned a parcel which had once formed part of Cicero's estate called Tusculum, and was much given to commenting on the fact. In 1825, Bonaparte excavated the so-called Tusculum portrait of Julius Caesar at the Tusculum's forum.

In 1823, Bonaparte was elected as a member of the American Philosophical Society.

Marriages and children
His first wife was his landlord's daughter, Christine Boyer (3 July 1771 – 14 May 1800), the illiterate sister of an innkeeper of Saint-Maximin-la-Sainte-Baume, and by her he had four children:
 Filistine Charlotte (28 November 1795 – 6 May 1865), married Prince Mario Gabrielli.
 Stillborn son (13 March 1796).
 Victoire Gertrude (born and died 9 July 1797).
 Christine Egypte (18 October 1798 – 1847), married firstly Count Arvid Posse (divorced) and secondly Lord Dudley Stuart.

His second wife was Alexandrine de Bleschamp (23 February 1778 – 12 July 1855), widow of Hippolyte Jouberthon, known as "Madame Jouberthon", and by her he had ten children:
 Charles Lucien Bonaparte (24 May 1803 – 29 July 1857), the naturalist and ornithologist.
 Letizia (1 December 1804 – 15 March 1871), married Sir Thomas Wyse.
 Joseph (14 June 1806 – 15 August 1807).
 Jeanne (22 July 1807 – 22 September 1829), married Marquis Honoré Honorati.
 Paul Marie (3 November 1809 – 7 September 1827).
 Louis Lucien (4 January 1813 – 3 November 1891). A philologist and politician, expert on the Basque language.
 Pierre Napoleon (11 October 1815 – 7 April 1881).
 Antoine (31 October 1816 – 28 March 1877), married Marie-Anne Cardinali, without issue.
 Marie Alexandrine (10 October 1818 – 20 August 1874), married Vincenzo Valentini, Count di Laviano.
 Constance (30 January 1823 – 5 September 1876), a nun.

Coat of arms

References

External links 

 Académie Francaise: Les Immortels: (in French)
 Lucien Bonaparte

1775 births
1840 deaths
Politicians from Ajaccio
Lucien
Lucien
Lucien
French diplomats
French Roman Catholics
People of the French Revolution
Members of the Council of Five Hundred
Expelled members of the Académie Française
Members of the Sénat conservateur
Members of the Chamber of Peers of the Hundred Days
French interior ministers
Deaths from stomach cancer
Deaths from cancer in Lazio